Up Holland High School is a coeducational secondary school located in Up Holland, Lancashire, England. It is a non-denominational comprehensive school. Prior to 1977 Up Holland High School was known as Up Holland Secondary Modern School and prior to the building of the Secondary Modern the site was the location of the old Up Holland Grammar School. After the old school burned down they adapted the school logo of a blue phoenix.

Notable former pupils
Richard Ashcroft of The Verve.
Leon Osman, midfielder for Everton Football Club as well as the two caps for the England national football team.
Laura Barton, journalist

Notable former teachers
 Stuart Cummings MBE former head of match officials for the Rugby Football League

See also

Listed buildings in Up Holland

References

External links
Up Holland High School Official website

Schools in the Borough of West Lancashire
Secondary schools in Lancashire
Community schools in Lancashire